The 1980 United States presidential election in North Dakota took place on November 4, 1980. All 50 states and The District of Columbia were part of the 1980 United States presidential election. State voters chose three electors to the Electoral College, who voted for president and vice president.

North Dakota was won by former California Governor Ronald Reagan (R) by a 38-point landslide. With 64.23% of the popular vote, North Dakota would prove to be Reagan's fourth strongest state after Utah, Idaho and Nebraska.

, this is the last election in which Sioux County, home of the Standing Rock Indian Reservation, voted for a Republican presidential candidate.

Results

Results by county

See also
 United States presidential elections in North Dakota
 Presidency of Ronald Reagan

References

North Dakota
1980
1980 North Dakota elections